Lennon Greggains (born 20 January 1999) is a Welsh rugby union player who plays for the Dragons as a flanker.

Greggains made his debut for the Dragons in 2017 having previously played for the Dragons academy, Cross Keys RFC and Newport RFC.

References

External links 
Dragons profile
itsrugby.co.uk profile

Welsh rugby union players
Rugby union flankers
Dragons RFC players
Rugby union players from Newport, Wales
Living people
1999 births
Hartpury University R.F.C. players